The 2014 Major League Soccer season was the 102nd season of FIFA-sanctioned soccer in the United States and Canada, the 36th with a national first-division league, and the 19th season of Major League Soccer. This season featured 19 total clubs (16 from the United States and 3 from Canada), each playing 34 matches during the regular season.

The 2014 Regular Season started on March 8 with Sporting Kansas City, the defending MLS Cup champion, playing at the Seattle Sounders FC. The 2014 Major League Soccer All-Star Game was held on August 6 in Providence Park in Portland, Oregon (hosted by the Portland Timbers) and featured a team of MLS All-Stars against Bayern Munich, the Bundesliga champions for the past two seasons. The game resulted in a 2–1 victory for the MLS All-Stars. The regular season ended on October 26; Seattle Sounders FC won the Supporters' Shield and the LA Galaxy went on to win the MLS Cup.

Teams, stadiums, and personnel

Schedule
Teams played 34 games: 17 at home and 17 away. The nine Western Conference teams faced each West club three times, with the home teams reversed from the previous year. The 10 Eastern Conference teams played 7 East teams three times (home teams reversed from 2013) and two East teams twice. Eastern and Western Conference teams played each other once, with the home team reversed from previous year.

Stadiums and locations

Personnel and sponsorship
 On October 29, 2013, Real Salt Lake announced a 10-year contract with LifeVantage to become their jersey sponsor effective January 1, 2014.  They replaced XanGo, which had been their sponsor since the 2006 season.
 On February 10, 2014, Portland Timbers announced a partnership with Providence Health & Services to rename their stadium to Providence Park, which had been called JELD-WEN Field since 2011.
 On February 24, 2014, D.C. United announced a multi-year jersey sponsorship with Leidos.
 On May 1, 2014, Colorado Rapids announced a multi-year jersey sponsorship with Ciao Telecom.
 On July 1, 2014, following two years without jersey sponsorship, Houston Dynamo announced a multi-year jersey sponsorship with BHP Billiton.

Note: All teams use Adidas as kit manufacturer.

Player transfers

Major League Soccer employs twelve methods to acquire players. These mechanisms are the following: (a) via allocation; (b) via the Designated Player Rule; (c) via the annual SuperDraft; (d) via trade; (e) placing a discovery claim; (f) via the Homegrown Player Rule; (g) via the annual Re-Entry Draft; (h) via the annual Waiver Draft; (i) through weighted lottery; (j) through an "extreme hardship" call-up; (k) by replacing a player who has been placed on the Season Ending Injury List; (l) by replacing a player who has been placed on the Disabled List.

Allocation ranking
The allocation ranking is the mechanism used to determine which MLS club has first priority to acquire a U.S. National Team player who signs with MLS after playing abroad, or a former MLS player who returns to the League after having gone to a club abroad for a transfer fee. The allocation rankings may also be used in the event two or more clubs file a request for the same player on the same day. The allocations will be ranked in reverse order of finish for the 2013 season, taking playoff performance into account.

Once the club uses its allocation ranking to acquire a player, it drops to the bottom of the list. A ranking can be traded, provided that part of the compensation received in return is another club's ranking. At all times, each club is assigned one ranking. The rankings reset at the end of each MLS League season.

 On January 14, 2014, Philadelphia Union acquired the No. 1 ranking and Ethan White from D.C. United in exchange for the No. 6 allocation ranking and Jeff Parke.

 On December 11, 2013, Seattle Sounders acquired the No. 2 allocation ranking from Chivas USA in exchange for the No. 13 allocation ranking and Tristan Bowen.

∞ On July 23, 2014, Houston Dynamo acquired the then-no. 1 allocation ranking (original ranking number 3) and allocation money from Toronto FC in exchange for the then-no. 14 allocation ranking (original ranking number 16) and Warren Creavalle.

 On July 29, 2014, Los Angeles Galaxy acquired the then-No. 3 allocation ranking (original ranking number 6) from D.C. United in exchange for the then-No. 11 allocation ranking (original ranking number 14), a second-round selection in the 2015 MLS SuperDraft, and Kofi Opare.

Managerial changes

Ownership changes

Rule changes 
The rules for the 2014 season are largely identical as those in 2013, with one major exception. For the first time in league history, the away goals rule will be used in two-legged MLS Cup playoff matches. MLS will use the version of the rule employed in CONCACAF competitions, which is applied only at the end of regular time of the second leg and not after extra time. MLS has also tweaked the tiebreaker rules for the league standings. The first tiebreaker remains total wins, but the second and third tiebreakers have been swapped—goal difference is now second and goals scored is third. All other tiebreakers remain the same as in 2013.

More minor changes include the following:
 The so-called "Special Discovery Signing" has been standardized. Under this provision, each team is allowed to amortize the total acquisition costs for one player, including the transfer fee, over the length of his contract without making him a Designated Player.
 Regulations for loans between MLS teams have been formalized. Each team may loan out one player per season to another league team, with the loan deal being finalized no later than the close of the primary transfer window (May 12 in 2014). The player must be no older than 24 at the time of the loan, must stay on the receiving team's roster for the entire season, and cannot play against the team that loaned him out. Deals may include an option to buy.
 Players who have trained for at least one year in a team's youth system, and have trained for at least 80 days with the team's academy in that year, may be signed to a first professional contract without being subject to the MLS SuperDraft.

The salary cap for 2014 has also been adjusted upward. The team salary cap, which as in previous years covers the first 20 of the 30 available roster spots, has increased to $3.1 million. The cap charge for a Designated Player is now $387,500, up from $368,750 last season. Midseason Designated Player signings carry a cap charge of $193,750. The minimum salaries for "off-budget" players (roster spots 21–30, including Generation adidas players) have also increased from last season.

Standings

Conference tables

Eastern Conference

Western Conference

Overall table 
Note: the table below has no impact on playoff qualification and is used solely for determining host of the MLS Cup, certain CCL spots, the Supporters' Shield trophy, seeding in the 2015 Canadian Championship, and position in the 2015 MLS SuperDraft. The conference tables are the sole determinant for teams qualifying for the playoffs.

Tie-breaking 
The teams are awarded three points for a win, one point for a tie (draw) and zero points for a loss. If teams have an equal number of points the following tie-breaking procedures apply: The second and third tiebreakers, goal differential and goals scored, have swapped places from the 2013 season.
 Most wins
 Goal differential (GD)
 Goals for (GF)
 Fewest disciplinary points 
 Road goals
 Road goal differential
 Home goals
 Home goal differential
 Coin toss (two teams) or drawing of lots (three or more)

MLS Cup Playoffs

Statistics
Full article: MLS Golden Boot

Top scorers

Source:

Top assists

Source:

|}

Top goalkeepers
(Minimum 1,500 minutes played)

Source:

Individual awards

Monthly awards

Weekly awards 

The player of the week is voted on by North American sports journalists. All other weekly and monthly awards are decided by an online fan vote.

Scoring
First goal of the season: Chad Barrett for Seattle Sounders FC against Sporting Kansas City, 94 minutes (March 8, 2014)
Fastest goal of the season: Javier Morales for Real Salt Lake against Houston Dynamo, 15 seconds (May 11, 2014)
Hat-tricks of the season:

Discipline
First yellow card of the season: Aurélien Collin for Sporting Kansas City against Seattle Sounders FC, 16 minutes (March 8, 2014)
First red card of the season: Patrick Nyarko for Chicago Fire against Portland Timbers, 86 minutes (March 16, 2014)

End-of-season awards

MLS Best XI

Source:

Coaches

Eastern Conference
Chicago Fire: Frank Klopas
Columbus Crew: Robert Warzycha
D.C. United: Ben Olsen
Houston Dynamo: Dominic Kinnear
Montreal Impact: Marco Schällibaum
New England Revolution: Jay Heaps
New York Red Bulls: Mike Petke
Philadelphia Union: John Hackworth
Sporting Kansas City: Peter Vermes
Toronto FC: Ryan Nelsen

Western Conference
Chivas USA: José Luis Real
Colorado Rapids: Óscar Pareja
FC Dallas: Schellas Hyndman
Los Angeles Galaxy: Bruce Arena
Portland Timbers: Caleb Porter
Real Salt Lake: Jason Kreis
San Jose Earthquakes: Mark Watson
Seattle Sounders FC: Sigi Schmid
Vancouver Whitecaps FC: Martin Rennie

Notes

References

External links
 

 
2014
1